The following lists events that happened during 1834 in Chile.

Incumbents
President of Chile: José Joaquín Prieto

Events

June
26 June - The Coat of arms of Chile is adopted.

Births
7 November - Manuel José Yrarrázaval Larraín (d. 1896)

Deaths
10 October -Bernardino Escribano

References 

 
1830s in Chile
Chile
Chile